Roycea pycnophylloides, commonly known as Saltmat, is a species of shrub endemic to Western Australia. It has no synonyms.

Description 
Roycea pycnophylloides is a perennial, dioecious herb which forms silvery, densely branched, mats of up to 1 m in diameter.  The branchlets are closely woolly and obscured by the alternate, imbricate, fleshy leaves which are about 2 mm long by 1 mm wide and silky when young.  The male flowers are cup-shaped with thin, ovate tepals which are about 1 mm long and silky outside. The anthers are exserted, and the  pistillode is  pubescent.  The female flowers are about 1 mm long, have no staminodes absent, and the stigmas are exserted and long (about 4 mm).  The fruit is broadly ovoid (about. 2 mm high) and is surrounded at the base by a persistent perianth.

Distribution and habitat
It is found near the Mortlock River near Meckering in southern Western Australia, growing on the saline sandy flats around the river.

References

pycnophylloides
Eudicots of Western Australia
Taxa named by Charles Gardner
Plants described in 1948
Dioecious plants